K Line European Sea Highway Services GmbH (KESS) is a roll-on/roll-off shipping line based in Bremen, Germany and is a subsidiary of the Japanese shipping line K Line.

Company overview
KESS was founded by K Line Tokyo in 2003 and operates with a fleet of 11 car carrier vessels in Western and Northern Europe. KESS specialises in feeder traffic, known as short sea shipping, between the large car terminals in Bremerhaven and Zeebrugge and various smaller car terminals in the North Sea and Baltic Sea area. It transports around 800,000 vehicles per year.

KESS has its roots in a joint venture established in 1991 between KESS parent company "K" Line Tokyo and the former Bremen - based automotive logistics company and shipowner Egon H. Harms.

KESS was created by to both offer an intra Europe short sea service to Japanese car makers manufacturing cars in European plants, and to provide feeder carriage to smaller European ports not called at by larger oceanic vessels.

The company in fact specializes in the maritime transport and distribution of cargo such as automobiles, trucks, trailers, Mafi roll trailers, heavy construction machineries and further types of rolling cargo.

The main trade lanes are European, and specifically ports in North Continent Europe, including Germany, Belgium, UK,
Ireland, Scandinavia, Baltic region and Russia.

The company operates 11 roll-on/roll-off ships.

Fleet 

(Status: January 2023)

Facts and accidents
KESS ships are distinguished from those of its parent company K Line by having their hull painted in red as opposed to the grey of K Line.

On 21 September 2017, Greenpeace activists attempted to block the discharging of Volkswagen Suv and cars into Sheerness port, disrupting for several hours the operations of mv Elbe Highway.

On 23 July 2018, car carrier vessel Makassar Highway ran aground at full speed in the Tjust archipelago near Loftahammar, Sweden, causing an oil spill.

Ships  gallery

See also
K Line
United European Car Carriers
Nissan Motor Car Carrier
Euro Marine Logistics
Toyofuji Shipping
Nippon Yusen Kaisha

References

External links
K Line RORO – web site
KESS website

Shipping companies of Germany
Ro-ro shipping companies
Car carrier shipping companies